Ice-T VI: Return of the Real is the sixth studio album by American rapper Ice-T. It was released on June 4, 1996, via /Priority Records. The title is a play on words based on the movie Star Wars VI: Return of the Jedi, with the "VI" referring to it being his sixth album. Production was handled by several record producers, including Aquel, Big Rich, DJ Ace, Dre MC, E-A-Ski, Hen-Gee, Mad Rome, San Man, SLJ, Trials Of Flowalistics, and Ice-T himself. It also features guest appearances from Hot Dolla, Powerlord JEL, Mr. Wesside, Godfather of Boo-Yaa T.R.I.B.E., Sean E. Sean of Body Count, Deft Saplin, K-Wiz Spurt, and Angela Rollins.

The album peaked at number 19 on the Billboard Top R&B/Hip-Hop Albums and at number 89 on the Billboard 200. One single, "I Must Stand", peaked at number 83 on the Billboard Hot R&B/Hip-Hop Songs and at number 21 on the Billboard Rap Songs. Along with a single, a music video was produced for the song, "I Must Stand".

Track listing

Personnel 

 Tracy Lauren Marrow – main artist, producer (tracks: 6, 10, 14, 18, 20), executive producer
 D. Brown – featured artist (tracks: 3, 12)
 Marlowe Bates – featured artist (tracks: 3, 12)
 Wesley Dawson – featured artist (track 3)
 Angela Rollins – featured artist (track 5)
 Ted Devoux – featured artist (track 21)
 Wendel Winston – featured artist (track 12), co-producer (tracks: 1, 5, 11)
 Dee – featured artist (track 10)
 Deft Saplin – featured artist (track 19)
 K-Wiz Spurt – featured artist (track 19)
 Sean E. Sean – featured artist (track 6)
 Bobby Ross Avila – talkbox (track 16)
 Eric Garcia – scratches
 Henry Garcia – producer (track 21), associate producer
 Richard Ascencio – producer (tracks: 3, 4, 9, 11-13, 15)
 Richard Bougere Jr – producer (tracks: 8, 16)
 Romy Geroso, Jr. – producer (tracks: 8, 16)
 Santiago Sanguillen – producer (tracks: 1, 5)
 Shafiq Husayn – producer (tracks: 7, 9)
 Shon Adams – producer (track 2)
 Denis Martinez – producer (track 19)
 Andre McPhearson – producer (track 21)
 Aquel – producer (track 17)
 Tom Baker – mastering
 David M. Halili – album cover painting & lettering
 Art Shoji – art direction
 Dana Hursey – photography
 Jorge Hinojosa – management
 Paul Filippone – management
 Eric Greenspan – management

Charts

References

External links

1996 albums
Ice-T albums
Albums produced by E-A-Ski
Priority Records albums